Bukit Tagar Highway, Federal Route 228, is a major highway in Selangor, Malaysia. It is also a main route to North–South Expressway Northern Route via Bukit Tagar Interchange. The Kilometre Zero of the Federal Route 228 starts at Jalan Sungai Tengi junctions, (route B74).

Features
At most sections, the Federal Route 228 was built under the JKR R5 road standard, allowing maximum speed limit of up to 90 km/h.

List of interchanges

References

Highways in Malaysia